= Ghost Searchers =

2020 American short film by Neil George

- Directed by: Neil George
- Written by: Neil George
- Produced by: Neil George
- Starring: Max Doubt; Jonny Lee; Dylan Terrill; Ashley McIntosh
- Edited by: Neil George
- Release date: October 16, 2020 (Bernal Heights Outdoor Cinema)
- Running time: 20 minutes
- Country: United States
- Language: English

Ghost Searchers is an American short film produced and directed by Neil George.

== Plot ==
A dark comedy short film that follows Matt and Jeff, two hapless local paranormal investigators in the wake of a community becoming more skeptical of the supernatural. When Robert hires them to take on a wild case, the Ghost Searchers must separate fact from fiction and help the troubled specter cross over to the other side.

== Cast ==
- Max Doubt as Matt
- Jonny Lee as Jeff
- Dylan Terrill as Robert
- Ashley McIntosh as Katie

== Awards ==
- Good Life Audience Award, 17th annual Bernal Heights Outdoor Cinema
